Teleio or teleios may refer to:
 Teleios (sculpture), a bronze carving 
 Zeus Teleios, a  baetylic idol
 Teleios Theological Training Institute, a university in Nassau
 Teleio, slang for teleiophile